The 1997–98 season was Chelsea F.C.'s 84th competitive season, their 9th consecutive season in the English top flight and 92nd year as a club.

Season summary
With conceding goals being a major issue last season, Chelsea signed Dutch international goalkeeper Ed de Goey, who proved to be a relative success. Chelsea's only other major signings were young Norwegian striker Tore Andre Flo and Uruguayan international midfielder Gustavo Poyet from Real Zaragoza, who added more goals from an otherwise very defensive midfield. Chelsea were well on course for a top-five finish and success in the European Cup Winners' Cup and the Coca-Cola Cup when manager Ruud Gullit was sacked on 12 February following a dispute with chairman Ken Bates. His job went to 33-year-old striker Gianluca Vialli, who took on the role of player-manager and achieved instant success - within three months of his appointment, Vialli had guided the Blues to glory on the continent and at Wembley. This success gave Chelsea fans hope that the following season could spell the end of their title wait which began in 1955.

Final league table

Results summary

Results by round

Results

Premier League

FA Cup

League Cup

UEFA Cup Winners' Cup

First team squad
Squad at end of season

Left club during season

Reserve squad

Statistics

|}

Transfers

In
 Laurent Charvet - Cannes, loan
 Ed de Goey - Feyenoord, £2,250,000, June 1997
 Gus Poyet - Real Zaragoza, free, June 1997
 Tore André Flo - Brann, £300,000, 1997
 Celestine Babayaro - Anderlecht, £2,250,000, 1997
 Bernard Lambourde - Bordeaux, 1997
 Graeme Le Saux - Blackburn Rovers, £5,000,000, August 1997

Out
 David Rocastle - Sabah, released, May 1998

Notes

References

1997-98
Chelsea
1997-98